Blockbusters is an American game show, created by Steve Ryan for Mark Goodson-Bill Todman Productions, which had two separate runs in the 1980s.  On this program, contestants answered general-knowledge questions to complete a path across or down a game board composed of hexagons. The first series of the show debuted on NBC on October 27, 1980, and aired until April 23, 1982. In the first series, a team of two family members competed against a solo contestant. Blockbusters was revived on NBC from January 5 to May 1, 1987, but featured only two solo contestants competing.

Bill Cullen hosted the 1980–82 version, with Bob Hilton as announcer. Johnny Olson and Rich Jeffries substituted for Hilton on occasion, with Jeffries taking over for the final two weeks. Bill Rafferty hosted the 1987 version, with Jeffries announcing the entire run.

Gameplay

1980–82
Blockbusters and Las Vegas Gambit, which premiered on the same day, were added to the NBC schedule to replace The David Letterman Show. Letterman's show, for which NBC had cancelled three game shows to create a space for back in June 1980, did not draw good ratings and only managed a total of eighteen weeks of episodes (and was cut in length from 90 minutes to 60 minutes midway into its run) before NBC decided to return to a more traditional morning lineup.

Three contestants played in each game, with a solo contestant playing against a team of two related contestants that was referred to as the "family pair". The solo contestant played behind a red desk while the family pair played from a white one.

The game was played on a board that consisted of four interlocking rows of five hexagons each. Within each hexagon was a different letter of the alphabet, which represented the first letter of the correct answer to a question. For example, if the letter P was chosen, a sample question might be: "What 'P' is a herbivorous North American mammal whose body is covered with thousands of bristles called quills?", in which case the correct answer would be "Porcupine". Contestants attempted to complete a connection of hexagons to win each round: in red from top to bottom for the solo player, and in white from left to right for the family pair. The solo player had the advantage of being able to win with as few as four hexagons, while the family pair required at least five. Due to the game board's design, there was no way to end a game in a tie. In addition, the two members of the family pair were not allowed to discuss questions at any time. All questions had one-word answers.

Each game started with a letter chosen at random. The first contestant to buzz in was given a chance to answer; if a contestant did so before the host finished the question, he stopped reading and the contestant had to answer immediately. A correct answer awarded the hexagon to that team and allowed them to choose the next letter, while a miss gave the opposing team a chance to hear the entire question and respond. If the solo contestant missed, only one member of the family pair could attempt to answer. If both teams missed the same question, a new one was asked using the same letter.

Originally, winning the first round earned the team no money but allowed the winning team to play the bonus round for $2,500. A second win allowed a return trip to the bonus round for an additional $5,000. Later, each round earned the winning team $500, and teams advanced to the bonus round only after winning two rounds. If the family pair advanced to the bonus round, the captain decided which member would participate.

From the premiere until the change in the front game format, champions retired from the show after winning eight matches. This limit was raised to 10 matches after the change, and later to 20. Following the second increase, several previously undefeated 10-time champions were invited to compete again on the show.

Gold Rush/Gold Run
The same board layout was used, with the left and right sides now colored gold, and the object was to complete a path across the board within 60 seconds. Each hexagon now contained up to five letters, standing for the initial letters in the correct response to a clue (e.g. for "EK" and a clue of "Former mayor of New York City," the correct response would be "Ed Koch"). A correct response turned the hexagon gold, while a miss or pass turned the hexagon black, forcing the contestant to work around that space to complete the path.

The bonus round was originally known as the "Gold Rush" and was played after each game in the match. A contestant/family team's first attempt was worth $2,500 if successful, and an additional $5,000 for the second attempt (dubbed the "Super Gold Rush"). Contestants earned $100 per correct answer if they failed to make a connection. When the format changed to a best-two-out-of-three match with $500 awarded per game, Gold Rush was played only after the match and was always worth $5,000.

In the show's 19th week on the air, the round's name was changed to "Gold Run".

1987 changes
When NBC revived Blockbusters in 1987, the solo-vs.-family pair contest was changed to two individual contestants playing. The champion represented white while the challenger represented red. Also, this version used a computer-generated board.

Again, the game was best two-out-of-three, with the advantage alternating between contestants in the first two games. If a tiebreaker game was needed, the board was reduced to a 4×4 field, with neither contestant having an advantage. Each win was worth $100. Contestants stayed until they won ten matches or were defeated.

The Gold Run was played exactly as before, with the contestant having to complete a left-to-right path within 60 seconds. The prize was originally a flat $5,000, but partway through the run it became a jackpot that began at $5,000 and increased by that amount every time it was not won. The jackpot reset to $5,000 whenever it was collected or a new champion was crowned. Throughout the run, the contestant received $100 per correct answer if he/she did not win.

The 1987 theme music was a stock music piece called "Run, Don't Walk" from the KPM music library, composed by British composer Richard Myhill but credited to the Music Design Group.

Home game
The Milton Bradley Company published a single home game edition in 1982. The front game play was the same as the show (with six possible board configurations to play with, although the arrangement of the hexagons was upside-down from what was used on the show). The Gold Run was also played with one of these boards, using only single-letter definitions rather than the multi-letter combinations frequently used on the television show.

Episode status

Both versions of the series are intact, and have aired on Game Show Network at various times. Reruns were first aired on CBN (now Freeform) in 1984, and was the first Goodson-Todman game show (along with Card Sharks) to be rerun on cable TV, pre-dating the launch of GSN 10 years later. GSN resumed airing the Cullen version on December 2, 2013, but it has since been dropped.  The Bill Cullen version began airing on the second day of Buzzr programming on June 2, 2015.

An episode was featured in the 1998 movie Great Expectations.

Reception
Cullen received an Emmy Award nomination for Best Game Show Host, his first ever, for hosting the show.

International versions

See also
 Hex (board game)
 Blockbusters (British game show), the longer-running British version based on the U.S. show

References

External links
 Blockbusters @ peasontv.com
 
 

1980 American television series debuts
1982 American television series endings
1987 American television series debuts
1987 American television series endings
1980s American game shows
English-language television shows
NBC original programming
Television series by Mark Goodson-Bill Todman Productions
Television series by Fremantle (company)
American television series revived after cancellation